In Law, a valid claim or colorable claim is a claim that is strong enough to have a reasonable chance of being determined both valid based upon its being sufficiently supported by law and provable fact to be plausibly proved in court.

United States (Federal) law
Valid claim is used in a number of different contexts in Federal law.

Within the area of United States patent law, a valid claim is a claim of an issued and unexpired, legally enforceable patent. 

Under US bankruptcy law, a creditor must have a valid claim in order to attend the creditors' meeting and to collect all or part of a debt.

A valid claim is used to describe beneficial interest in antiquities under the Native American Graves Protection and Repatriation Act (NAGPRA) of 1990.

Liens
A lien must be based on a valid claim.  Under Texas law, a mechanic's lien must have a valid basis.  Under New York law, a lis pendens, or notice of pendency of  a claim against real property, must be valid, such as a pending divorce lawsuit.   Under the law of most states, a claim against an estate must be proven or validated.

References

See also
Federal Tort Claims Act
Replevin

Legal terminology